Marco Aurélio Mendes de Farias Mello (born 12 July 1946, Rio de Janeiro) is a Brazilian former justice of the Supreme Federal Court of Brazil, appointed to the position by his cousin, former President of Brazil Fernando Collor de Mello.

In a controversial decision in October 2012, Marco Aurélio Mello released from jail Luiz André Ferreira da Silva, a politician of the city of Rio de Janeiro who had been arrested for involvement with the Milícia Mafia in Rio de Janeiro.

In 2020, Marco Aurélio Mello released Brazilian drug warlord André do Rap. The decision was reversed just a few hours later by the President of the Brazilian Supreme Court who ordered that the drug warlord be put back in jail, but by then he had become a fugitive.

Marco Aurélio retired from the STF on 9 July 2021.

References

External links
 Biography of Marco Aurélio Mello - Supremo Tribunal Federal

1946 births
Living people
Supreme Federal Court of Brazil justices
21st-century Brazilian judges
Brazilian people of Portuguese descent
Brazilian people of German descent
Election people
People from Rio de Janeiro (city)